Twisted Sister(s) may refer to:

Music
 Twisted Sister, a heavy-metal band

Film and Television
 Twisted Sisters, a 2006 German/UK crime thriller also known as Final Cut by director Wolfgang Büld
 Twisted Sisters, a 2016 U.S. thriller also known as Sorority Nightmare starring Sierra McCormick and Cassidy Gifford

Other
 Twisted Sisters (comic), an underground comix series by Aline Kominsky-Crumb and Diane Noomin
 "Twisted Sisters", a term used to refer to a proposed development in the Texpark site in Halifax, Nova Scotia, Canada